John Edward Rogers (8 February 1858 – 8 July 1935) was an Australian cricketer who played two first-class matches for Victoria during the early 1890s. Rogers was born in Sydney, New South Wales, though little else is known of his early life, including how and when he came to reside in the neighbouring colony of Victoria. A right-arm fast bowler, he made his first-class debut against Tasmania in March 1891, at the end of the 1890–91 season. He took a single wicket in a low-scoring affair, with John Carlton (5/26 and 7/53) and Norman Rock (5/21) dominating for Victoria and Tasmania, respectively. Rogers' second and final match for Victoria came at the beginning of the following season, against South Australia at the Adelaide Oval. He took 2/96 in South Australia's only innings, in a match notable for George Giffen's all-round dominance—Giffen scored 271 runs out of a total of 562 all out, and then took 16 wickets (9/96 and 7/70) to allow South Australia to win by an innings and 164 runs. Rogers played no further matches at a high level, and died in Melbourne in July 1935, aged 77.

See also
 List of Victoria first-class cricketers

References

1858 births
1935 deaths
Australian cricketers
Cricketers from Sydney
Victoria cricketers